Ust-Koksa (Kök-Suu Oozı) is a rural locality (a selo) and the administrative center of Ust-Koksinsky District of the Altai Republic, Russia. Population:

Climate

References

Notes

Sources

Rural localities in Ust-Koksinsky District